The Communes of Burundi are divided into 2,639 collines. Colline means "hill" in French, one of the three official languages of the country. The collines are listed below, by commune:

Bisoro

 Buburu
 Buhabwa
 Gitaramuka
 Kanka
 Kariba
 Kiganda
 Kirika
 Kivoga
 Mabaya
 Masango
 Mashunzi
 Munanira
 Musumba
 Nyabisiga
 Rubamvye
 Rutovu

Bubanza

 Buhororo
 Buvyuko
 Ciya
 Gahongore
 Gatura
 Gitanga
 Karinzi
 Kazeke
 Kivyiru
 Mitakataka
 Mugimbu
 Muhanza
 Muhenga
 Muramba
 Mwanda
 Ngara
 Nyabitaka
 Rugunga
 Rurabo
 Shari
 Urban Center
 Zina

Bugabira
 Gaturanda
 Gitwe
 Kigina
 Kigoma
 Kiri
 Kiyonza
 Nyabikenke
 Nyakarama
 Rubuga
 Rugasa

Buganda 

 Cunyu
 Gasenyi
 Kaburantwa
 Kagunuzi
 Kasega
 Murambi
 Muremera
 Mwunguzi
 Ndava
 Nimba
 Nyamitanga
 Ruhagarika

Bugarama

 Burangwa
 Cashi
 Gahuni
 Gitwaro
 Janda
 Kagoma
 Kayombe
 Kizuga
 Magara I
 Magara II
 Magara III
 Magara IV
 Mihongoro
 Mugendo
 Nyabungere
 Nyagushwe
 Saga

Bugendana

 Bitare
 Carire
 Cishwa
 Gaterama
 Gitongo
 Gitora
 Jenda
 Kibasi
 Kibundo
 Mirama
 Mugitega
 Mukoro
 Mutoyi
 Mwurire
 Nikanda
 Nyagisenyi
 Nyakeru
 Nyamagana
 Runyeri
 Rushanga
 Rwingiri
 Wiruvu

Bugenyuzi

 Bhindye
 Bihemba
 Bonero
 Nyagoba
 Rugazi
 Ruharo
 Rusasa
 Rusenga
 Rwandagaro
 Rwimbogo
 Teme

Buhiga

 Buhiga
 Buhinyuza
 Burenza
 Bushirambeho
 Cigati
 Gasenyi
 Gisenyi
 Gitanga
 Kajeri
 Kanyange
 Karamba
 Karunyinya
 Karuri
 Magamba
 Mayenzi
 Muhweza
 Miwoya
 Nkoronko
 Nyamabega
 Nzibariba
 Ramvya
 Rudaraza
 Rukamba
 Rutonganikwa
 Ruyaga
 Rweya
 Shanga
 Urban Center

Buhinyuza

 Bugungu
 Buhinyuza
 Bunywana
 Butihinda
 Bwasira
 Gasave
 Gihongo
 Gitaramuka
 Jarama
 Kara
 Karehe
 Karongwe
 Kibimba
 Kiyange
 Mabago
 Muramba
 Ntobwe
 Nyabucugu
 Nyagishiru
 Nyankurazo
 Nyaruhengeri
 Nyarunazi
 Rugazi
 Rugongo
 Ruvumu

Bujumbura Mairie

 Buterere
 Buyenzi
 Bwiza
 Cibitoke
 Gihosha
 Kamenge
 Kanyosha
 Kinama
 Kinindo
 Musaga
 Ngagara
 Nyakabiga
 Rohero

Bukemba
 Bugiga
 Bukemba
 Butare
 Gihofi
 Murama
 Rutanga

Bukeye

 Buhorwa
 Burarana
 Busangana
 Busekara
 Gahaga
 Gaharo
 Gashishima
 Gikonge
 Kigereka
 Kivogero
 Kiziguro
 Musumba
 Nyambo
 Nyarucara
 Rusha
 Rwantsinda
 Rweteto
 Shumba

Bukinanyana

 Bihembe
 Bubegwa
 Bumba
 Burimbi
 Burkinanyana
 Gahabura
 Gakomero
 Giserama
 Kibati
 Kibaya
 Munyinya
 Nderama
 Nyampinda
 Nyamyeha
 Nyangwe
 Nyarubugu
 Nyarwumba
 Rehembe
 Rtyazo
 Rusenda
 Sehe
 Shimwe

Bukirasazi

 Buhanda
 Bukirasazi
 Bunyuka
 Gasongati
 Kibere
 Kibuye
 Migano
 Mpingwe
 Buhanda
 Nyambuye
 Nyamisure
 Rugabano
 Rugoma
 Rukoki
 Ruvumu
 Rwinyana
 Shaya
 Tema

Burambi

 Bisaka
 Buhinyuza
 Busaga
 Busura
 Buyenzi
 Gahinda
 Gakonko
 Gatobo
 Gisenyi
 Gishiha
 Gitaba
 Gitaramuka
 Gitongwe
 Magana
 Maramvya
 Murara
 Murenge
 Muzi
 Rumonyi
 Rutwenzi
 Rwaniro

Buraza

 Bibate
 Bubaji
 Bugega
 Buraza
 Buriza
 Butemba
 Butezi
 Gicure
 Gisura
 Gitaramuka
 Kabumbe
 Mahonda
 Maza
 Mugano
 Musebeyi
 Muyange
 Ndago
 Ndava
 Rweza

Bururi

 Buhinga
 Burarana
 Burenza
 Burunga
 Gahago
 Gasenyi
 Gatanga
 Gisanze
 Jungwe
 Karwa
 Kiganda
 Kiremba
 Mahonda
 Mubuga
 Mudahandwa
 Mugozi
 Munini
 Murago
 Muzima
 Nyamiyaga
 Nyarugera
 Nyarwaga
 Nyavyamo
 Rukanda
 Rushemeza
 Ruvumu
 Tongwe
 Urban Center

Busiga

 Bigera
 Bitambwe
 Caga
 Cendajuru
 Gahini
 Gatika
 Gitemezi
 Kavumu
 Kididiri
 Kigufi
 Kimagara
 Kinyami
 Kirimba
 Magana
 Makombe
 Mihama
 Mpago
 Mparamirundi
 Mpondogoto
 Munyange
 Murambi
 Mureme
 Mutsindi
 Mutumba
 Muyogoro
 Nyabizinu
 Nyamisebo
 Nyange
 Nyanza Tubiri
 Rubari
 Rugori
 Rumbaga
 Rwanyege

Busoni

 Buhimba
 Burara
 Buringa
 Gatare
 Gatemere
 Gatete
 Gisenyi
 Gitete
 Higiro
 Kabanga
 Kagege
 Karambo
 Kibonde
 Kididiri
 Kigoma
 Kiravumba
 Kivo
 Kumana
 Marembo
 Mugobe
 Mukerwa
 Munazi
 Munyinya
 Murore
 Mutambi
 Muvyuko
 Muyange
 Nyabisindu
 Nyabugeni
 Nyagisozi
 Nyakizu
 Renga
 Rugarama
 Ruheha
 Runyinya
 Rurende
 Rurira
 Rutabo
 Ruvaga
 Rwibikare
 Sigu

Bwiza

Gihanga

Kamenge

Kanyosha

Kinama 

 Quartier Gitega
 Q. Ruyigi
 Q. Bubanza
 Q. Muyinga 
 Q. Muramvya

Musigati

Mpanda

Musaga

Ngagara

Nyakabiga 

 Kigwati 
 Nyakabiga I
 Nyakabiga II
 Nyakabiga III

Rohero

Rugazi

See also
Makamba
Vugizo
 Kiyazi
 Rutegama
 Rurambira
Nyanza-Lac

Subdivisions of Burundi
Lists of subdivisions of Burundi
Burundi 3